Matías Zaragoza (born 20 September 1995) is an Argentinian professional footballer who plays for Ferrocarril Midland.

In 2016, he was loaned to Belshina Bobruisk.

References

External links 
 

1995 births
Living people
Argentine footballers
Argentine expatriate footballers
Expatriate footballers in Belarus
Expatriate footballers in Uruguay
Boca Juniors footballers
FC Belshina Bobruisk players
Boston River players
Association football midfielders
Club Ferrocarril Midland players
Sportspeople from Buenos Aires Province